Manon is a 1949 French drama film directed by Henri-Georges Clouzot and starring Serge Reggiani, Michel Auclair and Cécile Aubry. It is a loose adaptation of the 1731 novel Manon Lescaut by Abbé Prévost. The film won the Golden Lion at the Venice Film Festival, and was a popular success with over three million tickets sold in France.

It was shot at the Victorine Studios in Nice. The film's sets were designed by the art director Max Douy.

Synopsis
Clouzot updates the setting to World War II, making the story about a French Resistance fighter who rescues a woman from villagers convinced she is a Nazi collaborator.

Cast
 Serge Reggiani	as Leon Lescaut
 Michel Auclair	as Robert Dégrieux
 Cécile Aubry as Manon Lescaut
 Andrex as Le trafiquant
 Raymond Souplex as M. Paul
 André Valmy as Lieutenant Besnard / Bandit Chief
 Henri Vilbert as Le commandant du navire / Ship's Captain
 Héléna Manson as La commère 
 Dora Doll as Juliette
 Simone Valère as Isé, la soubrette
 Gabrielle Fontan as La vendeuse à la toilette
 Gabrielle Dorziat as Mme Agnès		
 Rosy Varte as Petit rôle
 Michel Bouquet as Le second
 Robert Dalban as Le maître d'hôtel 
 Jean Hébey as L'hôtelière 
 Jean Témerson as Le portier du 'Magic'
 Jacques Dynam as Un marin 
 Max Elloy as Le garçon de restaurant
 Daniel Ivernel as American Officer 
 François Joux as L'architecte
 Geneviève Morel as La mère dans le tarin

References

Bibliography
 Lloyd, Christopher. Henri-Georges Clouzot. Manchester University Press, 2007.

External links
 
 

1949 films
1949 romantic drama films
Films about the French Resistance
Films based on French novels
Films based on romance novels
Films based on works by Antoine François Prévost
Films directed by Henri-Georges Clouzot
Golden Lion winners
Films with screenplays by Henri-Georges Clouzot
Films shot at Victorine Studios
French black-and-white films
French romantic drama films
1940s French-language films
1940s French films